The 1987 Lamar Cardinals football team represented Lamar University in the 1987 NCAA Division I-AA football season as an NCAA Division I-AA independent.  The Cardinals played their home games at Cardinal Stadium now named Provost Umphrey Stadium in Beaumont, Texas.  Lamar finished the 1987 season with a 3–8 overall record.  The season marked the first year competing as an independent.  Lamar left the Southland Conference to join the non–football American South Conference as a charter member along with fellow former SLC members, Louisiana Tech and Arkansas State and three other universities.

Schedule

References

Lamar
Lamar Cardinals football seasons
Lamar Cardinals football